The 2016 West Coast Conference men's basketball tournament was the postseason men's basketball tournament for the West Coast Conference and was held March 3–8, 2016 at the Orleans Arena in Paradise, Nevada. The winner of the tournament, Gonzaga, received the conference's automatic bid into the 2016 NCAA tournament.

Seeds
Only 9 of the 10 WCC teams participated in the Tournament due to Pacific's self-imposed postseason ban. As a result, the top 7 teams received a bye into the Quarterfinals. Teams were seeded by record within the conference, with a tiebreaker system to seed teams with identical conference records.

Schedule

Bracket

Game summaries

First round

#8 Loyola Marymount vs. #9 San Diego
Broadcasters: Dave McCann and Blaine Fowler
Series history: Series even 46–46

Quarterfinals

#3 BYU vs. #6 Santa Clara
Broadcasters: Dave McCann and Blaine Fowler (BYUtv)
Steve Quis, Casey Jacobsen, and Kelli Tennant (WCC TV)
Series history: BYU leads series 26–5

#4 Pepperdine vs. #5 San Francisco
Broadcasters: Dave McCann and Blaine Fowler (BYUtv)
Steve Quis, Casey Jacobsen, and Kelli Tennant (WCC TV)
Series history: San Francisco leads series 76–51

#1 Saint Mary's vs. #8 Loyola Marymount
Broadcasters: Roxy Bernstein and Brad Daugherty
Series history: Saint Mary's leads series 85–54

#2 Gonzaga vs. #7 Portland
Broadcasters: Roxy Bernstein and Brad Daugherty
Series history: Gonzaga leads series 97–66

Semifinals

#1 Saint Mary's vs. #4 Pepperdine
Broadcasters: Brent Musburger and Dick Vitale
Series history: Pepperdine leads series 71–64

#2 Gonzaga vs. #3 BYU
Broadcasters: Brent Musburger and Fran Fraschilla
Series history: Gonzaga leads series 9–6

Championship: #1 Saint Mary's vs. #2 Gonzaga
Broadcasters: Brent Musburger, Dick Vitale and Fran Fraschilla (ESPN)
Kevin Calabro and P. J. Carlesimo (Westwood One)
Series history:

See also
West Coast Conference men's basketball tournament
2016 West Coast Conference women's basketball tournament

References

Tournament
West Coast Conference men's basketball tournament
West Coast Athletic Conference men's basketball tournament
West Coast Athletic Conference men's basketball tournament
Basketball competitions in the Las Vegas Valley
College basketball tournaments in Nevada
College sports tournaments in Nevada